Mariola Wozniak (born 17 March 1998) is a Polish chess player and a woman international master.

She was a runner-up at the European Girls' Chess Championship.

She played as the reserve player for the Polish team which won the silver medal at the Women's event at the 42nd Chess Olympiad, playing in six games.

External links 
chessgames entry
Olympiad tournament entry

Polish female chess players
Living people
1998 births